Drop It 'til It Pops is the debut album by Hot Club de Paris. It was released on Moshi Moshi Records on October 9, 2006. The pre-track, "Welcome to the Hot Club de Paris", is only accessible by rewinding the CD in a compatible player on track one.

Track listing

Personnel
 Hot Club de Paris
Paul Rafferty - Bass guitar, Baritone Guitar, Lead Vocals
Matthew Smith - Guitar, Backing Vocals
Alasdair Smith - Drums, Piano, Glockenspiel, Organ, Percussion, Backing Vocals

Production
Tracks 0, 3, 4, 7, 12 produced and mixed by Adam Whittaker
Tracks 1, 5, 6, 8-11, 13 produced by Tim Speed, mixed by Adam Whittaker

References

2006 debut albums
Hot Club de Paris albums
Moshi Moshi Records albums